Jefferson Peak is a  mountain summit located in the Olympic Mountains in Mason County of Washington state. It is situated in the Mount Skokomish Wilderness, on land managed by Olympic National Forest. The mountain's name honors Thomas Jefferson (1743–1826), the third president of the United States. The nearest higher neighbor is line parent Mount Pershing,  to the southwest. Precipitation runoff drains into Jefferson Creen and the Hamma Hamma River.

Climbing

The first ascent of the summit was made in 1958 by Don Anderson, Bob Oram, Keith Spencer, and Robert Petersen. There are three established scrambling routes to the summit: from Goober Pond, the North Couloir, and via the East Peak. Jefferson Peak has a 250-foot-high subpeak called "Tran Spire" which was first climbed in 1958 by Don Anderson and Robert Petersen .

Climate

Jefferson Peak is located in the marine west coast climate zone of western North America. Most weather fronts originate in the Pacific Ocean, and travel northeast toward the Olympic Mountains. As fronts approach, they are forced upward by the peaks of the Olympic Range, causing them to drop their moisture in the form of rain or snowfall (Orographic lift). As a result, the Olympics experience high precipitation, especially during the winter months. During winter months, weather is usually cloudy, but due to high pressure systems over the Pacific Ocean that intensify during summer months, there is often little or no cloud cover during the summer. Because of maritime influence, snow tends to be wet and heavy, resulting in avalanche danger. The months April through August offer the most favorable weather for viewing or climbing this mountain.

Geology

The Olympic Mountains are composed of obducted clastic wedge material and oceanic crust, primarily Eocene sandstone, turbidite, and basaltic oceanic crust. The mountains were sculpted during the Pleistocene era by erosion and glaciers advancing and retreating multiple times.

Gallery

See also

 Olympic Mountains
 Geology of the Pacific Northwest

References

External links

 Weather forecast: Jefferson Peak
 Mount Skokomish Wilderness U.S. Forest Service

Olympic Mountains
Landforms of Mason County, Washington
Mountains of Washington (state)
North American 1000 m summits
Olympic National Forest